The New York Times Guild is the union of New York Times editorial, media, and tech professional workers, represented by NewsGuild since 1940. , the Times Tech Guild, is the largest tech union with collective bargaining rights in the United States.

Guild 

The Guild signed a contract in April 1941 for commercial department staff, and in August, was certified as the union for news and editorial workers.

Times workers have a 35-hour week with eligibility for overtime on the 36th hour and time-and-a-half on the 40th hour. Most union workers work more than 35 hours.

After 19 months of negotiation, the Guild approved a contract in late 2012 through March 2016 including modest raises and bonuses, a new pension plan, and continues their existing health plan. As of 2021, the editorial union contained over 3,000 reporters and media professionals.

The union staged a one-day walkout in December 2022, their first in over 40 years, while negotiating wages and other issues as part of their contract renewal. Their prior contract had expired in March 2021.

Tech 

More than 600 tech workers of the Times announced their union as the Times Tech Guild in April 2021. Formed under NewsGuild, the union would include the newspaper's digital workers, including software developers, data analysts, designers, and product managers. The Times declined to voluntarily recognize the union, sending the question to a formal vote facilitated by the National Labor Relations Board (NLRB). On March 3, 2022, the tech workers voted 404 to 88 to certify the union. The bargaining unit is the largest American union of tech workers with bargaining rights. The Alphabet Workers Union is larger but is not recognized by the NLRB.

During the union drive, NewsGuild filed an unfair labor practice claim in June 2021 in which the company told workers overseeing the work of interns that they were restricted from displaying union support. Reviewing the claim, the NLRB filed a complaint of interference in unionizing efforts, a violation of federal labor law. The case will be heard in March 2022.

In 2019, the New York Times Company voluntarily recognized a separate union representing tech workers at Wirecutter.

References

Further reading

External links 

 

Trade unions in the United States
Trade unions established in 1941
Trade unions established in 2021
The New York Times
Labor relations by company
Tech sector trade unions
Journalists' trade unions